Allerton Castle, also known as Allerton Park, is a Grade I listed nineteenth-century Gothic or Victorian Gothic house at Allerton Mauleverer in North Yorkshire, England. It was rebuilt by architect George Martin, of Baker Street, London in 1843–53.

Outside is St Martin's Church, Allerton Mauleverer.

History

Pre-1786
The Allerton estate belonged to the Mauleverer family from the time of the Norman Conquest. The nearby church of St Martin contains several tomb-monuments to them. When Richard Mauleverer died heirless in 1692, Allerton passed to his wife, who left the estate to Richard Arundell, her son by her second marriage.

Arundell rebuilt the house in the 1740s, and in 1745 remodelled the church in Norman revival style. The mid-18th century interior of the church remains unaltered to this day.

"The Grand Old Duke of York"

Following Richard Arundell's death in 1758, Allerton passed to Viscount Galway, whose son sold it in 1786 to Prince Frederick, Duke of York, second son of George III and brother of George IV.

Prince Frederick rebuilt the house to designs by Henry Holland, but sold the estate to Thomas Thornton shortly afterwards in 1789.

According to local legend, the ant-like activity of workers constantly ascending and descending to build this gigantic mound inspired the famous nursery rhyme concerning The Grand Old Duke of York and his 10,000 men.

1805–1983
The estate changed hands again in 1805 when purchased by the 17th Baron Stourton. The Hon Edward Stourton's family owned the house from 1805 to 1983 (the  Lords Mowbray). The contents were sold in 1965.

It then became 'Stourton House', and the Catholic peer added a chapel in Gothic style. However, in 1843 his son demolished the Georgian house and engaged George Martin, to build the present house in a Tudor-Gothic style. In 1856 work came to a halt as there was not enough money to complete all the interiors.

The house was used by the Royal Canadian Air Force  during the Second World War (for the headquarters of RAF Bomber Command's No. 6 Group RCAF) and in 1965.

The family ceased to live there after the death of the 22nd Baron Stourton.

1983–present
In 1983 the house was sold to Dr Gerald Rolph, an American businessman. The purchase included the house and gardens, but not the surrounding park which was retained by Lord Mowbray. Dr Rolph set about renovating the building to the highest standards, filling the house with furniture and pictures of appropriate scale and splendour.

The estate is now run by the Gerald Arthur Rolph Foundation for Historic Preservation and Education, and rooms are available to hire for corporate events and weddings.

A severe fire in January 2005 caused substantial damage to the north aspect of the castle, including the main dining room, library, rear entrance hall, two bedrooms and adjoining dressing rooms and bathrooms and the Servants' Wing. Restoration work commenced in the spring of 2006 and is now more or less complete. The restoration work by specialist contractors consisted of substantial repairs to the ornate stonework and windows, the installation of new floors at first, second and attic levels, significant steelwork, and a new roof structure to match the existing roof. Electrical, plumbing and heating installations as well as plasterwork were also renewed.

Arrangement
A short drive leads past a late 18th-century stable-block before the visitor is confronted with the Tudor-Gothic Victorian building. The main block is built of dark-coloured stone, with a high tower rising above the entrance porch. The lower brick range to the right houses the Chapel of 1805, and behind are the lower buildings of the service courtyard, dating from the 18th century.

The interior of Allerton was designed on a vast scale, with late-Gothic decoration in the style of Pugin's work on the Palace of Westminster. The early-Victorian craftsmanship and the recent restoration work are of the highest quality.

It is adorned by intricately carved oak panelling lit by stained glass windows, and has galleried landings whose walls are hung with full-length portraits including works by Michael Dahl and William Dobson.

The hall is central and gives access to the elegant drawing room, the blue-and-white ballroom, and the library with bookcases based on the original designs and restored in the on-site workshop. Most of the original bookcases, together with the books, were destroyed in the fire. The wallpaper was based on one of Pugin's designs for the Houses of Parliament and the ceiling has recently been repainted in the original colours.

The principal staircase opens off the great hall, under another vaulted ceiling hung with portraits of the Mowbray and Stourton families.

The library and dining room occupy the north side of the Hall. The dining room is panelled and has stained glass windows with the arms of the Mowbray and Stourton families. On the huge table, original to the house, are candelabra dating from 1848.

The drawing room has a magnificent plaster ceiling. On the walls are portraits by Michael Dahl and Charles Jervas, and vast rococo mirrors, made for Melton Constable Hall in Norfolk. The ballroom, in the west of the house, was left with bare masonry by Lord Mowbray and Stourton, but Dr Rolph has decorated it with a plaster vaulted ceiling.

On the entrance-side of the house are the Billiard Room, the Music Room, housing a collection of late-19th and early-20th century automatic musical instruments, and the Morning Room.

On a knoll to the west of the house is the "Temple of Victory", a fine octagonal building of Palladian design.

References

External links

Allerton Castle web site

Grade I listed buildings in North Yorkshire
Royal residences in England
Gothic Revival architecture in North Yorkshire
Houses completed in 1853
Grade I listed houses
Grade I listed castles
Country houses in North Yorkshire